Worlds Apart are an English multinational boy band of the 1990s, with a changing line-up that variously included Marcus Patrick (billed as Patric Osborne) in the original (five-piece) group and, from 1994, Brother Beyond's Nathan Moore. After scoring a few hits in the United Kingdom, the band re-emerged as a four-piece and became chart stars in France. Currently a trio, Steve Hart is its only original and continuous member.

History 
Worlds Apart released their first album in the UK and after a number of concert tours and regular television appearances, the band became hugely popular in Europe, where they signed a record deal with EMI.

Steve Hart became lead singer and songwriter for the band. After winning Best Newcomers at the prestigious Bravo Supershow, Worlds Apart quickly became the biggest boyband in France and were regularly supported by the Backstreet Boys and NSync. Worlds Aparts success continued all through Europe, the Middle East, South America and Asia. Due to their massive success, Worlds Apart represented France in the World Music Awards and also broke merchandise records in every concert hall in the country in the biggest ever French tour. With number one singles and albums under their belt the band sold well over 10 million records.
 
Worlds Apart's single "Baby Come Back" became the Nº. 1 airplay hit in Germany and Russia. The song was used as the theme on Brazils biggest TV soap.

The band undertook two tours of the Far East, covering Japan, South Korea, Thailand, Philippines, Taiwan, Hong Kong and Singapore.

In Germany the band was featured on national phone cards and their own brand of 'Capri-Sonne' orange juice was on sale in supermarkets. In France the band featured in the movie Les Visiteurs 2, and they released songs in Spanish, French, German and even Polish. Worlds Apart's success led to them filming 26 music videos and 7 long-form video releases and the sale of 138 different types of commercially released Worlds-Apart products including such varied items as swimwear, sunglasses, bubblegum, lamps, bedlinen, footwear, motorbikes, cameras, luggage, watches, jewellery, etc. Worlds Apart photo machines and sticker machines were even positioned at airports and train stations. The biggest European candy manufacturer HARIBO produced jellied sweets in the shape of the band's members' heads.

Discography

Albums

Singles

French singles

 "Everybody" – Silver (125,000)
 "Baby Come Back" – Gold (500,000)
 "Je te donne" – Platinum (750,000)
 "Don't Change" – Silver
 "Quand je rêve de toi" – Gold
 "Everlasting Love" – Gold
 "Je serai là" – Silver
 "On écrit sur les murs" – Platinum (2007)

References

External links
 
 

English pop music groups
English dance music groups
English boy bands
Musical groups established in 1992
Musical groups disestablished in 2002
Musical groups reestablished in 2007